The 4th constituency of Eure is a French legislative constituency in the Eure département.  It consists of the cantons  of Bourgtheroulde-Infreville,
Gaillon,
Louviers and
Val-de-Reuil.

Deputies

Election Results

2022

 
 
 
 
 
 
 
 
|-
| colspan="8" bgcolor="#E9E9E9"|
|-

2017

2012

References

French legislative constituencies of Eure